Stephen Robert Gajkowski (born December 30, 1969) is a retired Major League Baseball pitcher. He played during one season at the major league level for the Seattle Mariners. He was drafted by the Cleveland Indians in the 18th round of the 1990 Major League Baseball Draft. Gajkowski played his first professional season with their Rookie league Burlington Indians in 1990, and his last season with the Oakland Athletics' Double-A Midland RockHounds and Triple-A Sacramento River Cats in 2000.

External links
"Steve Gajkowski Statistics". The Baseball Cube. 15 January 2008.
"Steve Gajkowski Statistics". Baseball-Reference. 15 January 2008.
Baseball Almanac

1969 births
Living people
Seattle Mariners players
Major League Baseball pitchers
Baseball players from Seattle
Bellevue Bulldogs baseball players
Burlington Indians players (1986–2006)
Columbus Indians players
Watertown Indians players
Utica Blue Sox players
Sarasota White Sox players
Birmingham Barons players
Nashville Sounds players
Tacoma Rainiers players
Iowa Cubs players
Midland RockHounds players
Sacramento River Cats players